Bad Ragaz railway station is a railway station in the municipality of Bad Ragaz, in the Swiss canton of St. Gallen. It is an intermediate stop on the Chur–Rorschach line.

Services 
The following services call at Bad Ragaz:

 InterRegio:
 Hourly service between Zürich Hauptbahnhof and Chur.
 St. Gallen S-Bahn : half-hourly service between Sargans and Chur.

References

External links 
 
 

Railway stations in the canton of St. Gallen
Swiss Federal Railways stations
Bad Ragaz